John Thomas "Blondy" Black (August 20, 1920 – May 4, 2000) was a professional American football player.

Black was born in Philadelphia, Mississippi.  He attended Mississippi State University from 1939 to 1942, where he played football and ran track.  He was the offensive cornerstone of MSU's only undefeated football team in 1940. While competing for MSU, he held a school record for running the 100-yard dash in 9.6 seconds in 1941.  He averaged 6.1 yards per carry during his varsity football career.  Black holds the MSU record for highest yards per rush average in a single game (19.5) and in a season (6.9), both set in 1942. He was a two-time All-SEC selection in 1941 and 1942 and was a UPI All-American in 1943. He also was a three-year letterman in track.

While serving in the military during World War II, Black played professional football under the assumed name of Mike Matiza. In 1946, he played for the Buffalo Bisons, and in 1947 for the Baltimore Colts.

Early life and education
In 1943, Black joined the United States Marine Corps and became a lieutenant. While in the Marines, he played football under the name "Mike Matiza".

Black later pursued a career as a land developer and car dealership owner in Yazoo City. He was inducted into the Mississippi Sports Hall of Fame in 1976.

References

1920 births
2000 deaths
People from Philadelphia, Mississippi
Players of American football from Mississippi
American football fullbacks
Mississippi State Bulldogs football players
Buffalo Bisons (AAFC) players
Baltimore Colts (1947–1950) players
United States Marine Corps officers
American military sports players
United States Marine Corps personnel of World War II